Max David Komar (born April 30, 1987) is a former American football wide receiver. He was signed by the Arizona Cardinals as an undrafted free agent in 2010. He played college football at Idaho.

Komar has also played for the Chicago Bears.

External links
 Arizona Cardinals bio
 Idaho Vandals bio

1987 births
Living people
American football wide receivers
Idaho Vandals football players
Arizona Cardinals players
Chicago Bears players